Samuel Rosenberg may refer to:

 Samuel Rosenberg (writer) (1912–1996), American writer and photographer
 Samuel I. Rosenberg (born 1950), American politician in the Maryland House of Delegates
 Samuel Rosenberg (artist) (1896–1972), American artist and professor